Néstor Raúl "Pipo" Rossi (Buenos Aires, 10 May 1925 – 13 June 2007) was an Argentine footballer who played as a midfielder.

Playing career
Nicknamed "Pipo", he started his career at River Plate, playing from 1945 to 1949, and then again from 1955 to 1958, winning a total of 5 Argentine leagues. In total, Rossi played 155 matches for River Plate scoring 7 goals. From 1949 to 1955 he played in Colombia for Millonarios winning 6 championships. He also had a spell in Argentine Huracán, playing 54 matches.

Rossi played for the Argentina national football team during the 1958 FIFA World Cup, as well as in the Copa América in several occasions, winning the 1947 and 1957 editions.

Managerial career
After retirement, he managed the Spanish Liga team  Granada Club de Fútbol and River Plate in Argentina. He had a brief spell as manager of the Argentina national team in 1962. He replaced Adolfo Pedernera at Boca Juniors in 1965 to win the Argentine title. He also had a spell in charge of Ferro Carril Oeste in 1977. In 1983, he along with  Omar Sívori were named the head coaches for Toronto Italia in the National Soccer League, and managed the team's youth side.

Honours

Player

References

External links

 

1925 births
2007 deaths
Footballers from Buenos Aires
Argentine people of Italian descent
Argentine footballers
Association football defenders
Club Atlético River Plate footballers
Millonarios F.C. players
Club Atlético Huracán footballers
Argentina international footballers
1958 FIFA World Cup players
Argentine Primera División players
Categoría Primera A players
Argentine expatriate footballers
Expatriate footballers in Colombia
Argentine football managers
Argentine expatriate football managers
Argentina national football team managers
Club Atlético Huracán managers
Boca Juniors managers
Club Atlético River Plate managers
Ferro Carril Oeste managers
La Liga managers
Granada CF managers
Elche CF managers
Burials at La Chacarita Cemetery
Copa América-winning players
Cerro Porteño managers
Canadian National Soccer League coaches
Club Atlético Colón managers